Transmembrane protease, serine 4 is a protein in humans that is encoded by the TMPRSS4 gene.

This gene encodes a member of the serine protease family. Serine proteases are known to be involved in a variety of biological processes, whose malfunction often leads to human diseases and disorders. This gene was identified as a gene overexpressed in pancreatic carcinoma. The encoded protein is membrane bound with a N-terminal anchor sequence and a glycosylated extracellular region containing the serine protease domain. Multiple transcript variants encoding different isoforms have been found for this gene.

References

Further reading 

Genes on human chromosome 11
Human proteins